The 19th César Awards ceremony, presented by the Académie des Arts et Techniques du Cinéma, honoured the best French films of 1993 and took place on 26 February 1994 at the Théâtre des Champs-Élysées in Paris. The ceremony was chaired by Gérard Depardieu and hosted by Fabrice Luchini and Clémentine Célarié. Smoking / No Smoking won the award for Best Film.

Winners and nominees
The winners are highlighted in bold:

Best Film:Smoking/No Smoking, directed by Alain ResnaisGerminal, directed by Claude BerriMa saison préférée, directed by André TéchinéTrois Couleurs: Bleu, directed by Krzysztof KieślowskiLes Visiteurs, directed by Jean-Marie Poiré
Best Foreign Film:The Piano, directed by Jane CampionBa wang bie ji, directed by Chen KaigeManhattan Murder Mystery, directed by Woody AllenRaining Stones, directed by Ken LoachThe Snapper, directed by Stephen Frears
Best Debut:Mùi đu đủ xanh - L'odeur de la papaye verte, directed by Tran Anh HungCible émouvante, directed by Pierre SalvadoriLe Fils du requin, directed by Agnès MerletLes Gens normaux n'ont rien d'exceptionnel, directed by Laurence Ferreira BarbosaMétisse, directed by Mathieu Kassovitz
Best Actor:Pierre Arditi, for Smoking/No SmokingDaniel Auteuil, for Ma saison préféréeMichel Boujenah, for Le Nombril du mondeChristian Clavier, for Les VisiteursJean Reno, for Les Visiteurs
Best Actress:Juliette Binoche, for Trois Couleurs: BleuMiou-Miou, for GerminalCatherine Deneuve, for Ma saison préféréeSabine Azéma, for Smoking/No SmokingJosiane Balasko, for Tout le monde n'a pas eu la chance d'avoir des parents communistesAnouk Grinberg, for Un, deux, trois, soleil
Best Supporting Actor:Fabrice Luchini, for Tout ça... pour ça !Jean-Pierre Darroussin, for Cuisine et dépendancesJean-Roger Milo, for GerminalThomas Langmann, for Le Nombril du mondeDidier Bezace, for Profil bas
Best Supporting Actress:Valérie Lemercier, for Les VisiteursJudith Henry, for GerminalMarthe Villalonga, for Ma saison préféréeMarie Trintignant, for Les MarmottesMyriam Boyer, for Un, deux, trois, soleil
Most Promising Actor:Olivier Martinez, for Un, deux, trois, soleilGuillaume Depardieu, for Cible émouvanteMelvil Poupaud, for Les Gens normaux n'ont rien d'exceptionnelChristopher Thompson, for Les MarmottesMathieu Kassovitz, for Métisse
Most Promising Actress:Valeria Bruni Tedeschi, for Les Gens normaux n'ont rien d'exceptionnelChiara Mastroianni, for Ma saison préféréeVirginie Ledoyen, for Les MarmottesKarin Viard, for La Nage indienneFlorence Pernel, for Trois Couleurs: Bleu
Best Director:Alain Resnais, for Smoking/No SmokingClaude Berri, for GerminalAndré Téchiné, for Ma saison préféréeKrzysztof Kieślowski, for Trois Couleurs: BleuBertrand Blier, for Un, deux, trois, soleilJean-Marie Poiré, for Les Visiteurs
Best Writing:Jean-Pierre Bacri, Agnès Jaoui, for Smoking/No SmokingClaude Berri, Arlette Langmann, for GerminalPascal Bonitzer, André Téchiné, for Ma saison préféréeKrzysztof Kieślowski, Krzysztof Piesiewicz, for Trois Couleurs: BleuJean-Marie Poiré, Christian Clavier, for Les Visiteurs
Best Cinematography:Yves Angelo, for GerminalRenato Berta, for Smoking/No SmokingSławomir Idziak, for Trois Couleurs: Bleu
Best Costume Design:Sylvie Gautrelet, Caroline de Vivaise, Moidele Bickel, for GerminalFranca Squarciapino, for Louis, enfant roiCatherine Leterrier, for Les Visiteurs
Best Sound:Jean-Claude Laureux, William Flageollet, for Trois Couleurs: BleuPierre Gamet, Dominique Hennequin, for GerminalBernard Bats, Gérard Lamps, for Smoking/No Smoking
Best Editing:Jacques Witta, for Trois Couleurs: BleuHervé de Luze, for GerminalAlbert Jurgenson, for Smoking/No SmokingCatherine Kelber, for Les Visiteurs
Best Music:Khaled, for Un, deux, trois, soleilJean-Louis Roques, for GerminalZbigniew Preisner, for Trois Couleurs: BleuEric Lévi, for Les Visiteurs
Best Production Design:Jacques Saulnier, for Smoking/No SmokingHoang Thanh At, for GerminalJacques Bufnoir, for Justinien Trouvé, ou le bâtard de Dieu
Best Fiction Short:Gueule d'atmosphère, directed by Olivier PérayComment font les gens, directed by Pascale Bailly
Best Documentary Short:Emprientes, directed by Camille Guichard
Honorary César: Jean Carmet

See also
 66th Academy Awards
 47th British Academy Film Awards

External links
 Official website
 
 19th César Awards at AlloCiné

1994
1994 film awards
Cesar